Cephetola aureliae is a butterfly in the family Lycaenidae. It is found in the Democratic Republic of the Congo.

References

Butterflies described in 1999
Poritiinae
Endemic fauna of the Democratic Republic of the Congo